Miloš Degenek (born 28 April 1994) is a professional soccer player who plays as a defender for Major League Soccer club Columbus Crew. Born in Croatia, he represents the Australia national team. He is eligible to play for Australia as his family emigrated to Australia in 2000.

Degenek represented both Serbia and Australia at youth levels before making his senior international debut for Australia against England in 2016.

Early life
Degenek was born in 1994 in Knin, Croatia, which was then the capital of the self-proclaimed Serb proto-state Republic of Serbian Krajina. He lived in Orlić, a village near Biskupija, Croatia, where his father's family is from. His family was part of the Serb population of Croatia that fled the Croatian War of Independence to Yugoslav and Serbian capital Belgrade in 1995 during Operation Storm where they lived as refugees. In 2000, at six years of age, Degenek and his family emigrated to Sydney, Australia, settling in the suburb of Campsie.

Club career

Early career

Degenek played for the Westfields Sports High School and the Australian Institute of Sport. In the summer of 2012, he joined the under-19 team of VfB Stuttgart. Upon joining the club, Degenek admitted that he "had no communication from anyone from the Young Socceroos or under 20s."

In November 2012, Degenek was called up to the first team for the first time by manager Bruno Labbadia. Although he was never called up again to the senior team, Degenek spent the rest of the 2012–13 season, playing for the U19 side.

Miloš Degenek made his first appearance for VfB Stuttgart II on 26 July 2013 in the 3. Liga against SV Darmstadt 98. However, Degenek made only 9 appearances in the 2013–14 season, due to being sidelined with injuries. He continued to be sidelined for most of the 2014–15 season, and as a result would not make a single appearance that season. At the end of the 2014–15 season, Degenek was among expected to leave the side.

1860 Munich
At the start of the 2015–16 season, Degenek signed a two-year contract with 2. Bundesliga club 1860 Munich.

Degenek made his TSV 1860 Munich debut in the opening game of the season, where he started the whole game, in a 1–0 loss against 1. FC Heidenheim. Since making his TSV 1860 Munich debut, Degenek established himself in the starting eleven, playing in the defensive midfield. It wasn't until on 19 September 2015 when he scored his first goal for the club, in a 1–1 draw against 1. FC Kaiserslautern. He started in every match since the start of the season until he was suspended for one game over picking five yellow cards in mid–October. After that, he quickly regained his first team place later in the season despite facing competitions that saw him placed on the substitute bench. Despite being suspended on two occasions, including a second bookable offence, in a 2–1 loss against MSV Duisburg on 15 April 2016, Degenek went on to make 28 appearances and scoring once in all competitions at his first season at TSV 1860 Munich.

In the 2016–17 season, Degenek changed position when he moved into the central–defence at the start of the season. He started in every match since the start of the season until he ruptured intraarticular ligament initiation in knee and had to be substituted in a 2–2 draw against FC St. Pauli on 22 September 2016. After returning to the side that saw 1860 Munich win 6–2 against Erzgebirge Aue, Degenek, however, struggled to regain his first team place for the rest of the year.

Yokohama F. Marinos
On 26 January 2017, Degenek left 1860 Munich four months before the end of his contract and joined Japanese club Yokohama F. Marinos. It was reported that an undisclosed Chinese Super League club agreed to sign him. Degenek later reflected on his departure, saying that he needed to leave in order to keep his international status alive.

Degenek made his Yokohama F. Marinos debut in the opening game of the season, against Urawa Red Diamonds on 25 February 2017. Since making his Yokohama F. Marinos debut, Degenek established himself in the starting eleven for the side and started every match until he left to join the squad for the FIFA Confederations Cup. He also helped the side goes a 14 matches unbeaten. He then set up a goal for Takashi Kanai to help the side score the only goal in the game, in a 1–0 win over Ventforet Kofu. Despite later being demoted to the substitute bench at the end of the 2017 season, Degenek finished his first season at the club, making 28 appearances in all competitions. For his performance, he was named in the J.League Young Players' Best XI.

Ahead of the 2018 season, the club saw a change of new management, as Ange Postecoglou was appointed as new manager, who first called him up for the senior team. Degenek also signed a new contract with the club as well. At the start of the 2018 season, Degenek continued to establish himself in the starting eleven, playing in the centre-back position. He then scored his first goal for the club, in a 4–4 draw against Shonan Bellmare on 21 April 2018. A month later, on 16 May 2018, he scored again in the J.League Cup Group Stage, in a 2–1 win over Albirex Niigata. Three days later, on 19 May 2018, Degenek scored his third goal of the season, in a 5–2 win over V-Varen Nagasaki, in what turns out to be his last appearance for Yokohama F. Marinos. He went on to make 15 appearances and scoring 3 times for the side in all competitions.

Red Star Belgrade
On 5 July 2018, Degenek joined Red Star Belgrade, penning a three-year contract with his new club. The transfer fee was unofficially reported as €200k. Degenek was officially announced as a new signing the next day, choosing to wear the number 5 jersey.

Degenek made his debut for his boyhood club in the first second match of the First qualifying round for 2018–19 UEFA Champions League campaign, against Spartaks Jūrmala, playing as a central defender in tandem with Vujadin Savić. Several days later, on 20 July 2018, Degenek made his Serbian SuperLiga debut in 3–0 victory over Dinamo Vranje, pairing with Srđan Babić.

On 29 August 2018, Degenek made two assists to El Fardou Ben Nabouhane in 2–2 draw to Red Bull Salzburg, after which Red Star Belgrade qualified to the group stage of the 2018–19 UEFA Champions League. Following the end of the game, Degenek was nominated for a player of the match.

Al-Hilal
On 12 January 2019, Degenek was transferred to Saudi Arabian club Al-Hilal for around €3.5 million, signing a three and a half year contract. On 23 April 2019, he was chosen as man of the match in the 1–0 victory against Esteghlal in the group stage of the 2019 AFC Champions League.

Return to Red Star Belgrade 
On 22 July 2019, having been with Al-Hilal for just over six months, Degenek was loaned to his former club, Red Star Belgrade. Al-Hilal and Red Star agreed on a one-year loan with a purchase option for €1.5 million. After just two games, Red Star activated the purchase clause, bringing Degenek back to the Red-Whites. Degenek scored his first goal for Red Star in a 2–2 draw in the first leg of the 2019 Champions league play-off round against BSC Young Boys; Red Star would end up advancing due to away goals which enabled them appear in their second consecutive Champions League group stage. On 25 September, Degenek scored his first league goal for Red Star, a 3–1 victory over FK Voždovac.

Columbus Crew 
On 24 January 2022, it was announced that Degenek had signed for American side Columbus Crew, with Degenek himself stating that the move to Major League Soccer was driven due to the World Cup and wanting to stay fit, due to no longer being a first choice option for Red Star. "That probably helped me a bit decide on where I'm going to play." Degenek said. On 1 September, Degenek was included in the MLS Team of the Week for his performance in a 1–0 shutout versus Inter Miami CF.

International career
Degenek was eligible to play for Serbia, Croatia and Australia; he holds both Serbian and Australian citizenships.

Youth career
Degenek captained the national under-15 team of Australia in two friendlies against Japan in April 2009.

For the Australia under-16 team Degenek made on 6 October 2009 against Laos his first appearance in the 2010 AFC U-16 Championship qualification. He scored his first goal for this team on 16 October 2009 against Malaysia. Degenek was part of the Australian team which reached the semi-final of the final tournament of the 2010 AFC U-16 Championship.

At the Australia U17 side, Degenek scored his first Australia U17 goal, in a 4–3 against Portugal U17 on 26 August 2010. In the 2011 FIFA U-17 World Cup Miloš Degenek made two appearances for the Australia national under-17 team.

On 11 October 2012, Degenek made his debut for the Serbia national under-19 team against Turkey. Although he represented the U19 side, Degenek reflected on his switch, quoting: "I represented Serbia under 19s in eight games at a time where I was unsure of whether I was wanted in the Australian national set-up. But two years ago I was given the opportunity to represent the Olyroos and, later, the Socceroos. I knew that's what I wanted to do." Degenek went on to make eight appearances for the side.

On 26 August 2015, Degenek was called up to the Olyroos squad against Turkey and FYR Macedonia. He made his Olyroos debut on 4 September 2015, where he played the full 90 minutes in a 1–0 win over Turkey.

Senior career
Degenek made his Australia national team debut against England on 27 May 2016, coming on as a second-half substitute. He set up Australia's only goal in a 2–1 loss, his cross from the right forcing English defender Eric Dier to head into his own goal. He made his first start a week later, playing a full match in a win over Greece.

Degenek then received a lot of playing time under the management of Ange Postecoglou. On 31 May 2017, it was announced that Degenek made it to the final cut for the FIFA Confederations Cup squad. Degenek played two times in the tournament, which were against Germany and Cameroon. However, he was dropped to the substitute bench on the last game of the group stage, as they drew 1–1 against Chile.

Degenek continued to feature in the AFC Fourth Round against Syria, where he played both legs, in a 3–2 win on aggregate to qualify for the CONCACAF–AFC play-off against Honduras. In the CONCACAF–AFC play-off, Degenek played once in the first leg, as Australia won 3–1 to qualify for the World Cup.

In May 2018 he was named in Australia's 23-man squad for the 2018 FIFA World Cup in Russia. However, Degenek did not play in any of the three group stage matches, as Australia were eventually eliminated from the tournament.

On 30 December 2018, Milos scored his first international goal for Australia against Oman in an international friendly in the UAE. Degenek scored with a near post flick off a low Chris Ikonomidis corner kick with the ball lobbing over the defenders and into the net on the far post side of the goals. Milos told reporters in the post-match interviews that the goal involved a “fair bit of luck” and meant something special to him.

During the quarterfinals of the 2019 AFC Asian Cup, Degenek made an errant back-pass to goalkeeper Mathew Ryan that proved costly. United Arab Emirates striker Ali Mabkhout was able to intercept the pass and score the only goal in a 1–0 defeat, knocking the defending champion Socceroos out of the tournament.

Personal life
Degenek has an older brother, Đorđe Degenek. In addition to speaking Serbian, Degenek speaks English and German; In 2018 after joining Yokohama F. Marinos, he was learning Japanese.

Degenek used his salary to help his parents and brother, quoting: "My family supported me when I was little. Now I support them." Growing up, Degenek supported Red Star Belgrade.

Career statistics

Club
.

International

Scores and results list Australia's goal tally first, score column indicates score after each Degenek goal.

Honours

Club
Red Star Belgrade
Serbian SuperLiga: 2018–19, 2019–20, 2020–21
Serbian Cup: 2020–21

Al Hilal SFC
 AFC Champions League: 2019

References

External links

 Aussie Footballers Davis to Degney
 Miloš Degenek at National-Football-Teams.com

1994 births
Living people
Sportspeople from Knin
People from the Republic of Serbian Krajina
Soccer players from Sydney
Australian soccer players
Australia youth international soccer players
Australia international soccer players
Serbs of Croatia
Serb diaspora sportspeople
Serbian footballers
Serbian emigrants to Australia
Australian people of Serbian descent
Association football defenders
3. Liga players
2. Bundesliga players
J1 League players
Saudi Professional League players
TSV 1860 Munich players
VfB Stuttgart II players
Yokohama F. Marinos players
Al Hilal SFC players
Columbus Crew players
Expatriate footballers in Germany
Expatriate footballers in Japan
Expatriate footballers in Saudi Arabia
2017 FIFA Confederations Cup players
2018 FIFA World Cup players
2022 FIFA World Cup players
Red Star Belgrade footballers
Naturalized citizens of Serbia
Yugoslav Wars refugees
Refugees in Serbia
2019 AFC Asian Cup players
Australian expatriate sportspeople in Saudi Arabia
People educated at Westfields Sports High School
Australian expatriate soccer players
Australian expatriate sportspeople in Germany
Australian expatriate sportspeople in Japan
Australian expatriate sportspeople in the United States
Expatriate soccer players in the United States
Major League Soccer players
Serbia youth international footballers